System Shock Infinite is a mod for the 1999 first-person shooter video game System Shock 2. It is an unofficial sequel to System Shock 2 with story elements introduced in BioShock Infinite. The mod adds multiple endings based on the actions, choices, and factions the player chooses. It was developed by xdiesp, and was released in 2015 via Mod DB.

Gameplay 
The gameplay is almost the exact same as System Shock 2, however, it adds newer features, such as new weapons, and offers multiple storylines by summoning a "tear in protoreality."

Reception 
On Mod DB, the mod has received a 9.4 rating. Alice O'Connor of Rock Paper Shotgun describes the idea and plot of the mod as "very fanfic-y".

References

External links 
System Shock Infinite at Mod DB

2015 video games
Cyberpunk video games
First-person shooters
Linux games
MacOS games
System Shock
Video game mods
Video games set in outer space
Video games set in the 22nd century
Windows games